Odites duodaca is a moth in the family Depressariidae. It was described by Alexey Diakonoff in 1948. It is found in South Africa.

References

Moths described in 1948
Odites